Gemmulimitra margaritata is a species of sea snail, a marine gastropod mollusk in the family Mitridae, the miters or miter snails.

Description

Distribution

References

Mitridae
Gastropods described in 2009